This is a list of the most-visited museums in the United States in 2020. It is based upon the annual survey of museum attendance by the Art Newspaper published in March 2021, the TEA-AECOM Museum survey, published in September 2021, and some annual reports from the museums themselves.

The figures in this survey show the impact of the COVID-19 pandemic, which caused all of the museums on the list to be closed for long periods of time, and which greatly reduced tourism to the United States. Attendance at the twenty most-visited museums in The United States dropped by 80.1 percent, from 49,763,000 visitors in 2019 to 7,884,000 visitors in 2020.

Notes and Citations

See also
List of most-visited museums
List of most-visited art museums
List of most-visited museums by region
List of largest art museums
List of most visited palaces and monuments
List of most visited museums in the Netherlands
List of most visited museums in the United Kingdom

Lists of art museums and galleries
Museums, art